Dedicate  (1952–1973) was an American Champion Thoroughbred racehorse.

Background
Dedicate was bred in Kentucky by the renowned Claiborne Farm, and owned by Jan Winfrey Burke. His sire was the important Princequillo, a two-time Leading sire in North America and a seven-time Leading broodmare sire in North America. He was trained by Mrs. Burke's father, future U.S. Racing Hall of Fame inductee G. Carey Winfrey.

Racing career
Racing at age two to four Dedicate won several important races including the Brooklyn and Whitney Handicaps. However, at age five he was a major force in American racing, and his 1957 performances earned him American Champion Older Male Horse honors. He was controversially named Horse of The Year by the TRA after finishing third to Bold Ruler and Gallant Man in the rival DRF poll. Bold Ruler was also preferred in a poll conducted by Turf and Sport Digest magazine.

Stud record
Retired to stud, Dedicate sired a number of winners including Smart Deb, the 1962 Co-Champion 2-Two-Year-Old Filly and the multiple stakes-winning filly, Natashka. Loripori won against 2 and 3 year old fillies in Mexico, and he stood in Mexico for two seasons with Small Crops. Dedicate died in 1973 due to a heart attack whilst jogging in his paddock.

References

 Dedicate's pedigree and partial racing stats

1952 racehorse births
Racehorses bred in Kentucky
Racehorses trained in the United States
American Thoroughbred Horse of the Year
Thoroughbred family 23-b